CJBP-FM is a Canadian radio station, that broadcasts at 97.1 FM in Neepawa, Manitoba. The station broadcasts a country music format.  Its studio location is 290 Davidson Street in Neepawa. The station is transmitting with 3200 watts from the Manitoba Hydro Tower, located just east of Neepawa. It also provides coverage to surrounding areas including Arden, Gladstone and Minnedosa.

The station received CRTC approval on January 20, 2010. The official on-air date was April 17, 2010. 
It is owned by 5777152 Manitoba, a Manitoba-based broadcasting company. Its sister company, Stillwater Broadcasting, operates CJSB-FM in Swan River.

References

External links
CJ 97.1
 

JBP
JBP
Radio stations established in 2010
2010 establishments in Manitoba